Ugnasay is a rural locality (an ulus) in Kurumkansky District, Republic of Buryatia, Russia. The population was 35 as of 2010.

Geography 
Ugnasay is located 45 km northeast of Kurumkan (the district's administrative centre) by road. Maysky is the nearest rural locality.

References 

Rural localities in Kurumkansky District